"Keep It Clean" is the fourth television play episode of the second season of the Australian anthology television series Australian Playhouse. "Keep It Clean" was written by E.R. Thomas and originally aired on ABC on 10 July 1967 in Melbourne and on 14 August 1967 in Sydney

Plot
Two men unknown to each other try to crack a safe in an office building.

Cast
 Barry Creyton as a crooked bank manager
 Edward Howell
 Des Rolfe as janitor

Production
Barry Creyto later recalled "I enjoyed that. I got to play a scheming bank executive intent on robbing the bank vault and inadvertently being locked in it at the end. That was fun to do. By that time, we had tape. We still had to do it in one fell swoop, though."

Reception
The Canberra Times wrote the episode "had situation possibilities, but the plot itself...seemed contrived and rather maiden-auntish." The Age called it "too heavy for even Barry Creyton to lift."

References

External links
 
 

1967 television plays
1967 Australian television episodes
1960s Australian television plays
Australian Playhouse (season 2) episodes